Fedir Shvets ( Fedir Petrovych Shvets; November 11, 1882 – June 20, 1940) was a Ukrainian geologist, public activist, and statesman.

Biography 
Shvets was born in Zhabotyn, Cherkassky Uyezd, in the Kiev Governorate of the Russian Empire. From 1909 after finishing the Natural Studies College of the University of Tartu continued to work as an assistant at the Department of Geology. He actively participated in all the activities that took place in the university. Until 1916 simultaneously was teaching at the local gymnasium. In 1915 he was appointed as a docent of the academic department of paleontology and while conducting research in the Crimean peninsula and the Caucasus mountains.

In March 1917 Shvets returned to Ukraine. At the Congress of a Ukrainian village representatives (April 6–7, 1917) he was elected to the Central Committee (CC) of the Peasant Association from the Cherkassky Uyezd and also to the CC of the Ukrainian Socialist-Revolutionary Party (UPSR). In June 1917 at the 1st All-Ukrainian Peasant Congress Shvets was elected to the All-Ukrainian Council of Peasant's Deputies which later joined the Central Rada. During the same time he was working in the 2nd Kiev gymnasium and in the organizational committee for the creation of the Ukrainian People's University. In September 1918 he was appointed as a professor of geology in the Ukrainian State University in Kiev where he became its first pro-rector.

At times of the Ukrainian State Shvets joined the Ukrainian National Union and on November 13, 1918 together with Volodymyr Vynnychenko, Symon Petliura, Opanas Andrievsky, and Andriy Makarenko was elected to the Directorate. On November 15, 1919 with the agreement of both the Directorate and the government of the Ukrainian People's Republic (UNR) together with Makarenko departed abroad with a diplomatic assignment transferring all the power to Petliura. On May 25, 1920 the government of UNR dismissed him from the Directorate.

While in emigration he was teaching in the Ukrainian high-schools in Czechoslovakia where he lived in Prague. From 1923 Shvets was the professor of geology at the Ukrainian Liberal University and in 1924-1929 at the Ukrainian Higher Pedagogical Institute of Drahomanov. He was an author of numerous scientific works in geology. In 1928-1929 together with Andriy Makarenko and Opanas Andrievsky they created the Ukrainian National Rada. Shvets died in Prague.

Sources 

 Малий словник історії України (Small dictionary of history of Ukraine), editor Valeriy Smoliy. "Lybid", Kyiv; 1997.

1882 births
1940 deaths
People from Cherkassky Uyezd
University of Tartu alumni
Ukrainian geologists
Ukrainian democracy activists
Ukrainian Socialist-Revolutionary Party politicians
Russian Constituent Assembly members
Soviet emigrants to Czechoslovakia
Educators from the Russian Empire